Michael Joseph Galwey (born 8 October 1966) won an All-Ireland Senior Football Championship with the Kerry Gaelic football team in 1986, as a 19-year-old, before turning to rugby union. He is thus the only winner of an "All-Ireland" in both rugby union and Gaelic football. He also holds County Championship medals in Senior, Junior and Minor grades. His nickname 'Gaillimh' comes from the name of Irish town Galway, in the Irish language.

Rugby

Galwey was a key figure in Shannon R.F.C.'s side during their four in a row winning streak of All- Ireland League titles in the late 1990s. Throughout his career Galwey proved to be a leader who could inspire and motivate players around him to punch above their collective weights. Galwey instilled a "don't panic" and professional attitude in his Shannon team which later would become the hallmarks of Munster Rugby during his tenancy as captain.
Galwey is seen as a legend of the sport in his native Munster, particularly in Limerick.

Galwey's involvement in the Irish national squad was more of a mixed bag. Making his debut in 1991 against France, Galwey's 11-year international career was rarely without controversy. Owing to the  selection decisions of various national coaches and selectors, Galwey became the most dropped player in international history. He fought his way back onto the Irish squad, becoming the team's captain ten years after he made his debut. In the 1993 Five Nations Championship match against England, Galwey rounded off a fine display in the 17–3 defeat by scoring the only try of the game. His efforts were rewarded later that year when he was selected for the Lions tour to New Zealand.

Galwey played for the Ireland national rugby sevens team at the inaugural 1993 Rugby World Cup Sevens.

Record
Galwey's rugby record includes:
41 caps for Ireland, four times as captain and scorer of three tries
1993 Lions tour to New Zealand
130 caps for Munster, 85 as captain, 1 Celtic League
10 Munster senior cups and 6 All Ireland Leagues with Shannon R.F.C.
113 games for Shannon in the All-Ireland League, scoring 28 tries

He has coached Shannon to 2 All-Ireland League victories and 2 Munster Senior Cups.

Gaelic football

Before becoming a rugby player Galway played Gaelic football with Kerry. His first success at intercounty level came in 1986 when he was part of the Kerry team that won that year's All Ireland, Galway played in the semi final win over Meath. The following year he won a Munster Under 21 Championship medal and later played in the All Ireland final but his side lost out to Donegal. In 1989 he played his second and last championship game with Kerry in the Munster Championship first round win over Limerick a game that he also captained the side in.

At club level he played with his local Currow club. The club has produced 3 other senior Irish Rugby Internationals Moss Keane, Mick Doyle and Tommy Doyle, an All Ireland Minor winner in 1962, along with an U-20 Irish Rugby International, JJ Hanrahan. He played a key part in helping Currow win their first Kerry Junior Football Championship in 1988 when they beat Rathmore in the final.

He also played with the St.Kieran's divisional team. In 1988 he helped them to win their first and to date only Kerry Senior Football Championship title.

See also
 List of players who have converted from one football code to another

References

External links
Munster profile
Ireland profile

1966 births
Living people
British & Irish Lions rugby union players from Ireland
Currow Gaelic footballers
Gaelic footballers who switched code
Ireland international rugby union players
Irish rugby union coaches
Irish rugby union players
Kerry inter-county Gaelic footballers
Munster Rugby players
Munster Rugby captains
Shannon RFC players
Barbarian F.C. players
Rugby union players from County Kerry
Ireland international rugby sevens players